Kanishk Seth is an Indian composer, singer and songwriter, Kanishk became popular after his fusion album Trance With Khusrow, which he produced in collaboration with his mother Kavita Seth, and which was nominated for the Global Indian Music Academy Awards in 2015.

Personal life 
Kanishk belongs to a musical family, including his mother Kavita Seth and his sibling Kavish Seth.

Filmography

Songs

Awards and nominations

References

External links 

Hindustani instrumentalists
Indian guitarists
Living people
Slide guitarists
20th-century Indian musicians
Year of birth missing (living people)